Smithton Township may refer to:

Smithton Township, St. Clair County, Illinois
Smithton Township, Pettis County, Missouri

See also 
Smithton (disambiguation)

Township name disambiguation pages